RNA is a monthly peer-reviewed scientific journal that covers research on all aspects of RNA molecules, including their structures, metabolism, functions, and evolution. The journal was established in 1995 and originally published by Cambridge University Press. Since 2003 it is published by Cold Spring Harbor Laboratory Press on behalf of the RNA Society. The editor-in-chief is Timothy W. Nilsen (Case Western Reserve University).

Abstracting and indexing
The journal is abstracted and indexed in Science Citation Index, Current Contents/Life Sciences, BIOSIS Previews, Scopus, and Index Medicus/MEDLINE/PubMed. According to the Journal Citation Reports, the journal has a 2018 impact factor of 3.949.

References

External links

Delayed open access journals
Publications established in 1995
Biochemistry journals
Cold Spring Harbor Laboratory Press academic journals
Monthly journals